"The One with Phoebe's Wedding" is the twelfth episode in the tenth and final season of the American sitcom Friends. It first aired on the NBC network in the United States on February 12, 2004.

Plot
In the opening scene, Phoebe tells Joey that her stepfather is unable to get a day release from prison to walk her down the aisle for her wedding. She then asks Joey to substitute for him and walk her down the aisle, telling him how much he has been like a father to her. He enthusiastically agrees, and then spends most of the episode acting tense and weird to everyone else.

Monica drives Phoebe insane by planning the wedding and barking orders military style, complete with headset. At the rehearsal dinner, Chandler and Ross find out that they are not included in the wedding and complain to Phoebe, who tells them they were next in line. When one of Mike's groomsmen is unable to make it, Mike lets Phoebe decide who gets to be in the wedding, a job she passes to Rachel as a "bridesmaid job". During a rehearsal toast, Phoebe becomes upset with Monica for rushing her and making sure everything is spotlessly perfect even if no one likes it, and yells at Monica for not being able to give her the simple wedding she always wanted. She then finishes her angry speech off by firing Monica on the spot.

The next day, Phoebe is going through hell doing Monica's job, having items turning up in the wrong places and not knowing the technical name for orchids. Ross manages to convince Rachel to choose him as a groomsman by promising to always be on his best behavior but later Chandler also wins her over by relating to her his feelings about always being left out of important events in his life. However, she is unable to tell Ross she changed her mind, and after he and Chandler encounter each other with misgivings, they both confront her. With Rachel again unable to decide, Mike decides to have his dog, Chappy, as the missing groomsman. Unable to cope with planning her own wedding, Phoebe rehires Monica, wanting her to be "Crazy Bitch" again.

However, Joey informs the others of a giant blizzard, which has caused huge traffic problems and a major power outage to most of the city. As the snow begins to subside, Phoebe and Mike still want to get married, so they decide to do the simple wedding service in the street outside Central Perk with Monica's blessing. With the snow, Chappy cannot walk on his own, so Ross and Chandler both volunteer to hold him. Ross gets the job because Chandler is afraid of dogs, but Ross soon regrets it when the dog smells. With the minister cut off in the snow, Joey takes over because he is still ordained from Monica and Chandler's wedding. Chandler then substitutes for Phoebe's father, and as he walks her down the aisle, Phoebe refuses to wear a coat even though it is freezing, choosing to be her "something blue". Phoebe and Mike get married with almost no problems; after being pronounced as husband and wife, Phoebe complains about being cold, so Mike puts his jacket on her to keep her warm.

Reception
Purple Clover chose the episode as one of the 20 funniest episodes of Friends. In Digital Spy'''s ranking of the 236 Friends episodes, "The One with Phoebe's Wedding" was placed at #44. BuzzFeed ranked the episode #13 on their list of the 53 most iconic Friends episodes. Telegraph & Argus ranked it #44 on their ranking of the 236 Friends episodes. MSN ranked "The One with Phoebe's Wedding" #44 on their ranking of the 236 Friends'' episodes.

References

2004 American television episodes
Friends (season 10) episodes